The Associates Triangular Series in Kenya was a One Day International tournament involving the national teams of Canada, Kenya and Scotland, held in Mombasa. Each team played each other twice. The event took place at the Mombasa Sports Club.

Points Table

Matches

See also
Other triangular series featuring ICC associate members:

 Associates Triangular Series in South Africa in 2006–07
 Associates Triangular Series in West Indies in 2006–07
 Dubai Triangular Series 2014–15

References

External links
Cricket Archive's Tournament page

Kenyan cricket seasons from 2000–01
Sport in Mombasa
2006 in Kenyan cricket
One Day International cricket competitions
International cricket competitions in Kenya
2007 in Kenyan cricket